In some custody situations, it is possible that the child/children will not remain with either of their natural, biological, parents, but instead custody is awarded to a third person Generally speaking, third-party custody occurs when one of two options occur:.
The biological parents do not want custody of the child/children.
The biological parents are incapable of caring for the child/children.

Voluntary relinquishment
Occasionally, parents will agree to allow an adult (who is not either of the two parents) to raise their child/children. Generally, if either parent changes his/her mind later in the child's life, he/she has the option to seek custody at that point.

Unfit parents
Custody may be awarded to a third adult (who is not either of the two parents) because the parents both seemed unfit to do so.  Reasons that the court would retain authority over the child/children and later award custody to a third adult include:
Child abuse/neglect.
Substance abuse.
Deliberate desertion/abandonment of the child/children.
Inability to provide an adequate income which is necessary for the raising of a child.

See also
Divorce
Family law
Family court
Legal custody
Parens patriae
Parenting plan
Physical custody
Shared parenting
Ward of the state

References

Child custody
Juvenile law
Divorce
Family law
Marriage
Parenting
Fathers' rights
Mothers' rights